Eddy Clark Scurlock (January 13, 1905 – January 17, 1988) was an American oil industry tycoon, entrepreneur, millionaire, and philanthropist, who founded the Scurlock Oil Company; the Eddy Refining Company; and the charitable organization Scurlock Foundation in Houston, Texas.

Early life
He was born in Bronson, Texas, the son of Robert William Scurlock (January 5, 1862–May 9, 1950) and Ella Octavia Clark (September 13, 1877–February 12, 1970). He had four siblings: Winona Scurlock (1902–1990), Willie Faye Scurlock (1907–1971), Juanita Clark Scurlock (1909–1985), and Werter Chappell Scurlock (1911–1985).

He grew up in the small town of Tenaha. After high school, he went to work at a Standard Oil pipeline construction site as a kitchen assistant. He later moved to Houston, where he bought a gas station.

Career
In 1936, Scurlock borrowed money and formed Scurlock Oil Company. A decade later, he bought a Houston refinery and renamed it Eddy Refining Company.

His wife was Elizabeth Belschner (March 12, 1904–June 9, 2003), daughter of Andrew Belschner and Martha Quinn. They had one daughter, Laura Lee Scurlock (June 4, 1928–August 6, 1999). Laura married Jack Blanton, who became a Scurlock Oil and Eddy Refinery executive.

Scurlock established and chartered the charitable Scurlock Foundation in April 1954. He was a chairman of St. Luke's United Methodist Church, an advisory director of Texas Commerce Bank, and a director of Lon Morris College and Texas Medical Center. Scurlock also benefited the Methodist Hospital System and the Institute of Religion in Houston.

Later years
In 1982, Scurlock Oil Company was sold to Ashland Oil. Eddy Refining Company and the Scurlock Foundation continue operations.

Eddy C. Scurlock died at age 83 in Houston.

References

External links
174 Years of Historic Houston: Who's Who - Eddy C. Scurlock
Scurlock Foundation

1905 births
1988 deaths
American businesspeople in the oil industry
American chief executives
People from Houston
20th-century American businesspeople
People from Sabine County, Texas
People from Tenaha, Texas